JMR may refer to:
 Japan Media Review, an English academic online journal dedicated to the Japanese press
 Jean Marie River, in Northwest Territories, Canada
 Jelle's Marble Runs, a YouTube channel
 Jerónimo Martins,  Portuguese corporate group in food distribution and retail
 Job Masego Regiment, an infantry regiment of the South African Army
 John McIntyre Racing, a New Zealand motor racing team
 John Morris Russell, American orchestral conductor
 Jahkeele Marshall-Rutty, Canadian soccer player
 Journal of Magnetic Resonance
 Journal of Marketing Research
 Journal of Musculoskeletal Research
 Joint Multi-role Helicopter, precursor of Future Vertical Lift
 Junk Mail Reporting, Microsoft's name for Feedback loop